King's Lock is a lock on the River Thames in England. It is in open country to the north of Oxford, Oxfordshire, on the southern bank of the river. The lock was one of the last pound locks built on the Thames, built by the Thames Conservancy in 1928 to replace the former flash lock.  It has the smallest fall of any lock on the river, .

The lock is adjacent to a large island. Behind the island is the start of the Wolvercote Mill Stream leading to Dukes Cut, which connects the Thames to the Oxford Canal. The Mill Stream continues to rejoin the Thames below Godstow Lock. King's Weir is on the other side of the island below Duke's Cut. A small visitor information centre is situated at the lock.

History

There was a weir recorded at King's as far back as the 16th century. A pound lock was first proposed in 1817, but never built. A further proposal was made in 1845. The weir had a history of complaints about the water level and lack of attendance for the flash lock. Around 1872 a boatslide was built for the portage of small boats. The weir was rebuilt in 1885 but its replacement by a pound lock did not happen until 1928.

Access to the lock
The lock can be reached down a long track leading from the Godstow road just where it passes under the A34 Oxford by-pass.
There is a public footpath across the lock and weir.

Reach above the lock
Just upstream of the lock, the Thames reaches its northernmost point. Above the lock is the connection with Dukes Cut on the northern side and further on, on the southern bank, the Seacourt Stream separates off to rejoin at Kennington Railway Bridge. The river runs through completely open country and, halfway along, the River Evenlode joins from the northern side, followed by the Cassington Cut, now a branch of the Evenlode. Wharf Stream also joins on the same side just before Eynsham Lock.

The Thames Path follows the southern bank to Eynsham Lock.

See also 

 Locks on the River Thames

References

Locks on the River Thames
Locks of Oxfordshire